Seminole Golf Club is a private golf club in the southeastern United States, located in North Palm Beach, Florida.  Designed by Donald Ross in 1929, it is consistently ranked as one of the top 100 courses in the nation.

History
Investment banker Edward Francis Hutton began development of the private,  Seminole Golf Club in 1929 on land previously owned by Harry Kelsey.  The site chosen for the course featured a number of sand dune ridges that were carefully brought into play with some fairways directed towards elevated green sites while others drop down from sandy peaks to flatter terrain.  Both nines set out from the clubhouse on level ground before veering into the  dune ridge that runs alongside the western edge of the property.

The greens at Seminole are the main line of defense for the course and many of them are cleverly angled, narrowing towards the back which makes rear pin positions extremely tough.  Fairway bunkers are generally shallow but sand traps adjacent to the putting surfaces are often deep and troublesome. The course is most noted for its clever routing on a fairly rectangular site, which results in a new wind direction on each hole.

The layout occupies a flat-bottomed bowl set between a high ridge of dunes to the west and the dunes along the Atlantic Ocean to the east.  In the middle lie the necessary ponds to handle the drainage.  Ross' layout managed to have 14 of the 18 holes touch these two lines of dunes (the 1st, 8th, 9th and 10th holes do not).  To reflect and complement the sweep of the sandy property, Ross also used bunkering that was not typical of his other work. Instead of the more standard low-profile bunkering, Ross used flashed-face sand traps that are reminiscent of a George Thomas course rather than a Donald Ross work.

Throughout its history, the club has long been known as a golf club for the corporate elite. In 1947, the club's members included Joseph P. Kennedy, Henry Ford II, Jack Chrysler, Paul Mellon, Phillip Armour, John Pillsbury and Robert Vanderbilt.  The club has also hosted kings and presidents: President Dwight D. Eisenhower was an honorary member,  Presidents Gerald Ford and John F. Kennedy played it often; and the Duke of Windsor was a member. Henry Picard, winner of the 1938 Masters Tournament, was the professional at Seminole for 26 years and Ben Hogan spent a significant amount of time here playing and practicing. More recently, several media outlets reported in April 2020 that NFL great Tom Brady had joined the club, shortly after he moved from his longtime team of the New England Patriots to the Tampa Bay Buccaneers. Gerry McIlroy, father of golf professional Rory McIlroy is a member at Seminole.

Following a period of relative neglect during and after World War II, Dick Wilson was commissioned to restore the course to its former glory. The original Ross greens were re-grassed and new bunkers were installed, which were intended to mimic the crests of waves on the adjacent Atlantic. In 2016, Bill Coore and Ben Crenshaw were tasked to carry out a three-year renovation of the course, which focused on the rebuilding of over 100 bunkers and exposed sandy expanses in the rough. The extent of the renovations over the years has remained relatively minor, and Seminole Golf Club, along with Pinehurst #2, are both considered by many to be Donald Ross' two masterpieces.

In May 2020, amid the COVID-19 pandemic in the United States, the club hosted a charity skins game organized by Golf Channel, TaylorMade Driving Relief, between Rory McIlroy, Dustin Johnson, Rickie Fowler and Matthew Wolff, with proceeds supporting responses to the pandemic by the American Nurses Foundation and CDC Foundation. It marked the first televised golf event in the United States since the aborted 2020 Players Championship, and the first televised event at the private club in its history.

The club hosted the Walker Cup in May 2021, a 14–12 victory for the United States.

Scorecard

References

Golf clubs and courses in Florida
Golf clubs and courses designed by Donald Ross
Sports venues in Palm Beach County, Florida
Walker Cup venues
1929 establishments in Florida
Sports venues completed in 1929